Heimano Donovan Bourebare is a Tahitian footballer currently playing for A.S. Tefana. He represented his country in the 2009 FIFA U-20 World Cup and now is a full-time member of the Tahiti national football team. He was in the starting line-up in the five 2012 OFC Nations Cup matches, where his national side won the tournament for the first time.

Bourebare's mother is Tahitian and his father is from New Caledonia.

International goals

Domestic
Tahiti First Division:
 Winner (2): 2010, 2011

Tahiti Cup:
 Winner (2): 2010, 2011

International
OFC Champions League:
 Runner-up (1): 2012

OFC Nations Cup:
 Winner (1): 2012

International career statistics

References

External links
http://www.zerozero.pt/jogador.php?id=114321&epoca_id=0&search=1

Living people
1989 births
People from Tahiti
French Polynesian footballers
AS Mont-Dore players
Tahiti international footballers
2012 OFC Nations Cup players
2013 FIFA Confederations Cup players
2016 OFC Nations Cup players
Association football midfielders